is a Japanese professional boxer who has held the WBO female junior-bantamweight title since 2020. At regional level she held the OPBF female bantamweight title in 2020.

Professional career
Okuda suffered defeat in her professional debut, losing via fourth-round knockout to Wakako Fujiwara on 5 April 2015, at the Osaka Prefectural Gymnasium (now called Edion Arena) in Japan.

After compiling a record of 6–2–2 (1 KO), she challenged WBO female junior-bantamweight champion Miyo Yoshida on 13 December 2020, at the Edion Arena. Yoshida suffered a cut above her right eye in the fifth round due to an accidental clash of heads. After the cut worsened in the sixth, the referee called a halt to the contest, forcing the decision to rely on the judges' scorecards. Two judges scored the bout 59–54 and the third judge scored it 57–56, all in favour of Okuda, handing her the WBO title via sixth round technical decision.

Professional boxing record

References

External links

Living people
Year of birth missing (living people)
Date of birth missing (living people)
Sportspeople from Gifu Prefecture
Japanese women boxers
Super-flyweight boxers
Bantamweight boxers
World super-flyweight boxing champions
World Boxing Organization champions